Kükür is a village in Anamur district of Mersin Province, Turkey. The population of Kükür was 219 as of 2012.

References

Populated places in Anamur District